Raymond Arthur Ethridge Jr. (born September  11, 1968) is a former American football wide receiver. He played college football at Pasadena City College. He was selected by the San Diego Chargers in the 3rd round (63rd overall) of the 1992 NFL draft. Was the First guy ever to go to the NFL from a Jr college

Early years
Ethridge was born in San Diego, but moved to Texas in seventh grade. He returned to San Diego in 12th grade and enrolled at Crawford. After finishing third in the 100, second in the 200 and fourth in the 400 relay at the state championship track meet. As a senior, he out ran future Cleveland Browns wide receiver Patrick Rowe.

College career
After playing football at Pasadena City College at the urging of NFL wide receiver Anthony Miller, signed a letter of intent to attend New Mexico State but instead chose to play in the Canadian Football League.

Professional career

Canadian Football League
In his lone season playing for the BC Lions in the Canadian Football League, Ethridge played in six games and caught 18 passes for 200 yards and a touchdown. He eventually asked for and was granted his release so that he could try out for the NFL. While in Canada, he beat Raghib "Rocket" Ismail in a 100-meter race.

National Football League
Ethridge was selected in the 3rd round (63rd overall) of the 1992 NFL draft by the San Diego Chargers.

On September 5, 1995 he was signed by the Cleveland Browns to their practice squad. He then spent the 1996 and 1997 season with the Baltimore Ravens, during which he played in 16 games with one start and caught two passes for 24-yards. He re-joined the Chargers in the late 1990s and was released on June 16, 1999.

Personal life
Ethridge has at least two children .

References

1968 births
Living people
American football wide receivers
Canadian football wide receivers
American players of Canadian football
Pasadena City Lancers football players
BC Lions players
San Diego Chargers players
Cleveland Browns players
Baltimore Ravens players
Players of American football from San Diego
Players of Canadian football from San Diego